Khlid Qayyum (born 21 November 1958) is an Indian former cricketer. He played 67 first-class matches for Hyderabad between 1976 and 1990.

See also
 List of Hyderabad cricketers

References

External links
 

1958 births
Living people
Indian cricketers
Hyderabad cricketers
Cricketers from Hyderabad, India